Helle Degn (born 20 October 1946 in Copenhagen) is a Danish politician. She is a member of the Danish Social Democrats and chairman of Mandela Center, Denmark. In 2000 she was made a Commander of the Order of the Dannebrog by Queen Margrethe II.

Career
 1969–1971 Member of the Tårnby Municipal Council
 1971–1975 Member of Parliament (Folketinget)
 1977–2000 Member of Parliament (Folketinget)
 1977–1993, 1994–2000 Member of the Danish Board of the Inter-Parliamentary Union
 1997, 1980, 1985, 1995 and 2000 Member of the Danish delegation to the UN World Conference on Women
 1982–1987 Chairperson of the Equal Status Commission under the Prime Ministers Office
 1993–1994 Minister of Development Cooperation
 1993 Head of delegation of the UN Conference on Human Rights
 1994 Head of Delegation at the UN Conference on Population in Cairo
 1993–1999 Socialist International Women (SIW) (Vice-President)
 1994–1998 Vice-President of Organization for Security and Co-operation in Europe - Parliamentary Assembly, and Chairperson of the OSCE Socialist Group
 1994–2000
 Chairman of the Foreign Policy Committee of Parliament (Folketinget)
 Chairman of the Danish delegation to the OSCE-PA
 Member of the Danish delegation to the Council of Europe
 Chairperson of the Committee on Economic Affairs and Development, Council of Europe
 Member of the Finance Committee of Parliament (Folketinget)
 Vice-President of the Socialist International Women
 Spokesperson for the Social Democrats on Foreign and Security Policy
 Chairperson of the UN Parliamentary Group of Parliament (Folketinget)
 1997–2000 Chairman of P.D. Burma
 1998–1999 President of OSCE - Parliamentary Assembly
 1999–2000 President of OSCE - Parliamentary Assembly. (2nd term)
 2000–2004 Commissioner of the Council of the Baltic Sea States on Democratic Development
 2004 Member of the board of Rehabiliterings centret for etniske kvinder i Danmark (RED) ("Rehabilitation Centre for ethnic women in Denmark")
 2005 Member of Presidium of the International Club of Copenhagen. ICC
 2005–2008 President of Rehabiliterings centret for etniske kvinder i Danmark. (RED)
 2006 Member of Social Economics think-tank
 2006 Appointed Ambassador for Dansk Folkehjælp ("Danish People's Aid")
 2008 Chairman of Mandela Center, Denmark

External links
 Official home page 
 Mandela Center

1946 births
Living people
Government ministers of Denmark
Politicians from Copenhagen
Members of the Folketing
Social Democrats (Denmark) politicians
Women government ministers of Denmark
Women members of the Folketing